Hyuk Shin (Hangul: 신혁; born June 5, 1985) is a South Korean record producer and singer-songwriter. His team, A-Rex, created the song "One Less Lonely Girl" for Justin Bieber in 2009. He has worked with many major artists in K-pop, including GFriend, Exo, Shinee, DEAN, Oh My Girl, Girls' Generation, Monsta X, NCT, Got7 and SF9, among others.

Career

Early career
Shin began his career as a singer-songwriter in 2004, with the release of his first album "Soar". The title song "Robot" was composed by the famous K-pop ballad composer "Hyung-seok Kim" and the lyrics were written by the famous Korean poet, 'Tae-yeon Won'. At age 20, he moved to Boston, Massachusetts to attend Berklee College of Music to achieve his goal that he had since 5th grade; charting his song on the Billboard. In his interview with Korean digital music library website/application MelOn in 2012, he mentioned that moving to United States to develop his musical ability was the best decision he has ever made.

A-Rex Production
Teaming up with songwriter Sean Hamilton, Shin started the music production duo "A-Rex". They worked together for 4 years until they made Justin Bieber's "One Less Lonely Girl," which debuted at No. 16 on the Billboard Hot 100, on the issue dated October 24, 2009. The song had 113,000 downloads in its first week and later scored the second highest debut of the week, only being surpassed by "3" by Britney Spears. As of February 2011, the single has sold over 1,025,000 digital copies in the United States. In his MelOn interview, he said those 4 years of waiting to achieve the goal, were the hardest time in his life. A-Rex also produced "Right Here Waiting" by Tynisha Keli and "Supa Luv" by Korean male idol group, Teen Top. The song was later remixed and featured on the American movie "Beastly" by the director Daniel Barnz, starring Vanessa Hudgens and Alex Pettyfer.

153 Joombas Music Group
In 2011, Shin established independent music production and music publishing company "Joombas Music Group" with offices in Los Angeles, New York, and Seoul. Joombas began producing for major K-pop labels such as SM Entertainment and TOP Media, working to bring fresh, new sounds to the music industry. In 2011, Shin and Joombas were brought-in to contribute to the production and writing of EXO's debut album MAMA in the song "Angel." Exo's debut album MAMA was released in Korea and China in two language editions - Exo-K's Korean version and Exo-M's Mandarin version, and both versions hit No. 1 in Korea (Gaon Chart) and China (SINA Chart). 
Joombas made waves in the K-pop music industry in 2013. With Shin leading the team, Joombas produced "Romantic St." by "Girls' Generation," "Dream Girl" by "Shinee," "Light Me Up," "G.R.8.U.," and "Voodoo Doll" by VIXX, "Want U Back" by "100%, "Pretty Girl" by F(x), and the mega hit-song "Growl" by EXO. "Growl" peaked at #3 on the Billboard Korea K-Pop Hot 100 chart and number two on South Korea's Gaon Singles chart. The song has also reached #1 one on most of South Korea's major downloadable charts, and stayed in the top five for three consecutive weeks. "Growl" is one of Exo's most successful songs in both chart performance and on South Korean music show awards, winning a total of fourteen number-one trophies throughout its promotional period. Shin and Joombas also produced the songs "Don't Go" and "Black Pearl" for Exo's debut studio album, XOXO.  Joombas has continued to establish itself as one of the premiere independent music production and music publishing companies in South Korea. 

As of 2018, Joombas Music Group has rebranded to 153/Joombas Music Group.

Artist Discovery: Blackbear & DEAN
Prior to his rise as a prominent artist, Matthew Tyler Musto (FKA blackbear), was discovered by Shin while he was working as a producer in Atlanta, Georgia. Recognizing Musto's potential as a songwriter and artist, Shin helped to craft and develop his sound. Musto would go on to co-write the smash single "Boyfriend" for superstar Justin Bieber in 2012.

In 2012, Shin discovered and signed R&B artist Kwon Hyuk (FKA DEAN). Signed to Joombas initially as a songwriter and producer, Shin acknowledged DEAN's potential as an artist and together, began to develop and prepare his project. On July 13th, 2015, DEAN released his first single "I'm Not Sorry," featuring Grammy award winning artist Eric Bellinger. The single gained significant attention as it was rare for a South Korean artist to release an international single in English prior to entering their home market. DEAN would go on to release several more singles featuring popular Korean hip-hop and R&B artists such as Zico, Crush, Dok2, and Gaeko leading up to the release of his debut EP 130 mood: TRBL on March 25th, 2016, which was executive produced by Shin. The album has been highly regarded as one of the best Korean R&B releases in the 2010s, receiving praise from notable music editors such as Billboard's Jeff Benjamin. The EP was selected as one of the 10 Best K-Pop Albums of 2016 by Billboard.

Partnership

Warner Music Group 
IIn 2018, Shin launched 153 Entertainment Group in a joint-venture partnership with Warner Music Group. 153's first flagship artist in the new partnership is singer-songwriter NIve, who released his first single "Getaway" featuring independent artist JMSN on November 8, 2018. 153 is continuing to grow its business into all facets of the music entertainment industry across Asia, including music publishing, music production, record label, artist management, and music education.

Warner Chappell Music 
153/Joombas Publishing announces that it has entered a global publishing partnership with Warner Chappell Music in 2021, as 153/Joombas Publishing continues to bolster its roster and catalog, with a roster of nearly over 100 writers, 153/Joombas Publishing has become a key partner for Warner Chappell Music in K-Pop and the Asia territory at large.

Warner Chappell provides access to a global network of creatives and services that look to help optimize 153/Joombas Publishing’s current resources and grow its reach. In joining hands with Warner Chappell, 153/Joombas Publishing is poised to increase the range of diverse services that it can provide in the market.

Discography

References

1985 births
Living people
South Korean record producers
South Korean pop singers
21st-century South Korean male singers
Berklee College of Music alumni
South Korean male singer-songwriters